Amt Neustadt (Dosse) is an amt (collective municipality) in the district of Ostprignitz-Ruppin, in Brandenburg, Germany. Its seat is Neustadt (Dosse).

The Amt Neustadt (Dosse) consists of the following municipalities:
 Breddin
 Dreetz
 Neustadt (Dosse)
 Sieversdorf-Hohenofen
 Stüdenitz-Schönermark
 Zernitz-Lohm

Demography

References

Neustadt
Ostprignitz-Ruppin